Cole-Parmer Instrument Company, now known as Antylia Scientific. The company serves professionals in biopharma, environmental and life sciences.

History 
The company was founded by Jerry Cole and John Parmer in 1955 and took up shop in a  loft on West Illinois Street in downtown Chicago. In the 1960s, Cole-Parmer acquired Masterflex peristaltic pumps, followed shortly by the purchases of Gilmont Instruments and Manostat Pumps.

They were acquired by Fisher Scientific, now Thermo-Fisher Scientific, in 2001.

On July 17, 2014, Thermo Fisher Scientific Inc. agreed to sell one of its lab units, Cole-Parmer, to private-equity firm GTCR for $480 million in cash. The company has previously said its $13.6 billion acquisition of Life Technologies Corp. would allow it to cut costs while gaining from next-generation genetic-sequencing machines. It has also sought to expand in Asia-Pacific markets.

In 2021, Cole-Parmer changed its name to Antylia Scientific.

Product offering
Cole-Parmer offers a variety of lab products. Many of their products are related to research and process. Cole-Parmer also offers calibration and instrument repairs through InnoCal.

References

Business services companies established in 1955
Distribution companies of the United States
Companies based in Vernon Hills, Illinois
1955 establishments in Illinois